Kamnaskires III (also spelled Kammashkiri III) was the Kamnaskirid king of Elymais from 82/1 BC to 75 BC. Elymais had since 124 BC been under complete Parthian control. However, in 81/80 BC, coins of king Kamnaskires III and his wife Anzaze appears, which indicates that the kingdom had been restored. According to Babylonian sources, the incumbent Parthian monarch Orodes I launched an expedition into Elymais in 78 BC, where he defeated Kamnaskires III. Kamnaskires III was not deposed, however, and continued ruling the kingdom now as a Parthian vassal. Kamnaskires III's successor is unknown, however, it is known that Kamnaskires IV ruled Elymais from 62/1 BCE.

References

Sources 
  (2 volumes)
 
G. J. P. McEwan: A Parthian Campaign against Elymais in 77 B.C., in: Iran, 24 (1986), pp. 91-94
D. T. Potts: The Archaeology of Elam, Cambridge University Press, Cambridge 1999, p. 392
 
 

1st-century BC rulers in Asia
Vassal rulers of the Parthian Empire
Kings of Elymais